Science fiction theatre includes live dramatic works, but generally not cinema or television programmes. It has long been overshadowed by its literary and broadcast counterparts, but has an extensive history, and via the play R.U.R. introduced the word robot into global usage.

Background
Ralph Willingham in his 1993 study Science Fiction and the Theatre catalogued 328 plays with sf elements, several of which were adaptations. Christos Callow Jr created the Internet Science Fiction Theatre Database in 2018 including mainly 21st century plays that feature elements of science fiction, fantasy and horror. In addition to productions of individual plays, the science fiction theatre festival Sci-Fest LA was launched in Los Angeles in 2014, and the festivals of Otherworld and Talos: Science Fiction Theatre Festival of London were both launched in 2015 in Chicago and in London, UK respectively.

Posle milijon godina (After Million of Years), written by Dragutin Ilić in 1889, is considered the first science fiction theatrical play in the history of the world literature.

Chronological selection of science fiction plays
 Presumption; or, the Fate of Frankenstein adapted from Mary Shelley's novel of the same name by Richard Brinsley Peake, 1823 
 Journey Through the Impossible by Jules Verne and Adolphe d'Ennery, 1882  
 Dr. Jekyll and Mr. Hyde adapted from Robert Louis Stevenson's novella The Strange Case of Dr Jekyll and Mr Hyde by Thomas Russell Sullivan, 1887
 Dr. Jekyll and Mr. Hyde an unauthorised adaptation of Robert Louis Stevenson's novella The Strange Case of Dr Jekyll and Mr Hyde by John McKinney, 1888
 Dr. Jekyll and Mr. Hyde, Or a Mis-Spent Life adapted from Robert Louis Stevenson's novella The Strange Case of Dr Jekyll and Mr Hyde by Luella Forepaugh and George F. Fish, 1897
 R.U.R. by Karel Čapek, 1920
 The Blue Flame by George V. Hobart and John Willard, 1920
 Back to Methuselah by George Bernard Shaw, 1922
 The Makropulos Affair by Karel Čapek, 1922
 The Bedbug by Vladimir Mayakovsky, 1929
 The Bathhouse by Vladimir Mayakovsky, 1930
 Night of the Auk by Arch Oboler, 1956
 Rhinoceros by Eugène Ionesco, 1959
 The Bedsitting Room by Spike Milligan and John Antrobus, 1962 
 The Curse of the Daleks by David Whitaker and Terry Nation, 1965
 Doctor Who and the Daleks in the Seven Keys to Doomsday by Terrence Dicks, 1974
 Starstruck by Elaine Lee, 1980
 Henceforward... by Alan Ayckbourn, 1987
 A Clockwork Orange: A Play with Music by Anthony Burgess adapted from his novel of the same name, 1987 
 Greenland by Howard Brenton, 1988
 Doctor Who – The Ultimate Adventure by Terrence Dicks, 1989
 They're Made Out of Meat by Terry Bisson, 1991 short story later adapted by author as a play
 Communicating Doors by Alan Ayckbourn, 1994 
 Comic Potential by Alan Ayckbourn, 1998 
 Whenever by Alan Ayckbourn, 2000 
 Far Away by Caryl Churchill, 2000
 A Number by Caryl Churchill, 2004
 My Sister Sadie by Alan Ayckbourn, 2003
 The Cut by Mark Ravenhill, 2004
 Mercury Fur by Philip Ridley, 2005
 Klingon Christmas Carol by Christopher Kidder-Mostrom and Sasha Warren, 2007
 Really Old, Like Forty Five by Tamsin Oglesby, 2010
 A Thousand Stars Explode in the Sky by David Eldridge, Robert Holman and Simon Stephens, 2010
 Earthquakes in London by Mike Bartlett, 2010
 Doctor Who Live by Will Brenton and Gareth Roberts, 2010
 Frankenstein adapted from Mary Shelley's novel of the same name by Nick Dear, 2011 
 Future Shock by Richard Stockwell, 2011
 The Nether by Jennifer Haley, 2011
 The Crash of the Elysium by Tom MacRae, 2011 
 Constellations by Nick Payne, 2012
 Mr. Burns, a Post-Electric Play by Anne Washburn, 2012
 Jerome Bixby's The Man From Earth adapted by Richard Schenkman from Jerome Bixby's film of the same name
 1984 adapted from George Orwell's novel of the same name by Robert Icke and Duncan MacMillan, 2013
 King Charles III by Mike Bartlett, 2014
 The Future Boys Trilogy by Stephen Jordan, 2012-2015
 Game by Mike Bartlett, 2015
 Elegy by Nick Payne, 2016
 Solaris adapted from Stanisław Lem's novel of the same name by David Greig, 2019

Research
There is generally little research on science fiction theatre, but a notable exception is "Science Fiction and the Theatre" by Ralph Willingham and the international conference series on science fiction theatre, "Stage the Future." Contemporary dramatic science fiction scholar Dr. Ian Farnell, examines how science fiction narratives, themes and images have emerged as an evolving dramatic strategy for engaging twenty-first century critical discourse. His work discussing portrayals of A.I. and robotics in caregiving and medical settings, highlights the importance of continued inquiry into the challenges presented by science fiction works, and the unique possibilities for staging and intervening upon these issues through the medium of theatre. Other research projects include the Robot Theatre project by Louise LePage.

See also
Science fiction opera

References

Sources
Willingham, Ralph. Science Fiction and the Theatre. London: Greenwood Press, 1993